The 2020 Supercoppa Italiana was the 24th edition of the Supercoppa Italiana.

The matches were played in Chiavari at Stadio Comunale between 6-10 January 2022 and Juventus won for the second time in a row.

Usually 2 teams participate in the competition, but the COVID-19 pandemic caused the Coppa Italia to end prematurely and it was decided to involve the best 4 teams of the 2019–20 Serie A: Juventus, Fiorentina, Milan and Roma.

Qualified teams 
Italian Football Federation has confirmed that four teams will be competing in 2020 Supercoppa Italiana (women) competition: Juventus, Fiorentina, Milan and Roma. The Federation also confirmed that the semi-finals and the final will be played at a neutral venue.

Matches

Bracket

Semi-finals

Final

Broadcasting
Italian pay-TV broadcaster Sky Italia has secured linear and digital rights to domestic women’s club football competitions for the 2020–21 season as part of an extended rights deal with the Italian Football Federation, which includes Supercoppa Italiana (women).

See also
Supercoppa Italiana (women)

References

Football in Italy
Sport in Italy
Football competitions in Italy
2020–21 in Italian women's football
Supercoppa Italiana (women)